Ethmoidal arteries may refer to:
 Anterior ethmoidal artery
 Posterior ethmoidal artery